Eastern spadefoot or Eastern spadefoot toad may refer to:

Scaphiopus holbrookii or eastern spadefoot, a toad found in North America
Pelobates syriacus or eastern spadefoot, a toad found in Eastern Europe and the Middle East
Eastern spadefoot toads (Leptobrachium'''), a genus of Southeast Asian toads, from family Megophryidae'', unrelated to the above species

Animal common name disambiguation pages